Christogonus Ezebuiro Obinna (1947 – 2 June 1999), alias Dr. Sir Warrior, was a Nigerian Igbo highlife musician who was the leader of the Oriental Brothers International Band which was famous in the Nigerian Igbo highlife music scene for several decades. He performed primarily in Nigeria, as well as performing internationally in places such as London and the United States of America with his crew. Originally, the founder of the group is Ferdinand Emeka Opara.

Musical career
Dr. Sir Warrior was able to transform his performance into a successful career in the 1970s when he joined the Oriental Brothers International Band. The band later splintered, leading to Prince Ichita & the Great Oriental Brothers International Band, Oriental Brothers International, and then the original Dr. Sir Warrior & His Oriental Brothers International, simply called The Oriental Original.  He had about 12 platinum and 10 gold hits in his career.

Family 
Dr Sir Warrior was married and had five children (three boys & two girls).  His first son had said of him "He did not allow us to get interested in music. He wanted us to finish our education first.  He would always emphasize that education was the best legacy, other things could follow later". The younger Ajuzieogu knew that he would one day be a highlife musician like his dad. They both said, "As long as we intend to pursue music as career we will still abide with our father's wish".  His legacy was summarised by Oliver De Coque, who in paying tribute to Dr. Sir Warrior, said, "He was a very good and amiable person. We have lost such a genius in highlife." 
Though his children are currently working on immortalizing him as a profound legend in African highlife, Sir Warrior died on June 2, 1999, because of a brief illness after his last 2 performances.

References

Further reading
 Wale, P. The Highlife Years: History of Highlife Music in Nigeria. Ibadan: Effective, 1995.

Musicians from Imo State
Igbo-language singers
Igbo highlife musicians
1954 births
1999 deaths
20th-century Nigerian male singers